Ancylomarina is a genus of bacteria from the family Marinifilaceae.

References

Bacteroidia
Bacteria genera